Charles Williamson Crook (4 March 1862 – 29 March 1926) was an English teacher, trade union official and a Conservative and Unionist Party politician. He was the Member of Parliament (MP) for East Ham North twice, from 1922 to 1923 and from 1924 to 1926.

Crook was born in Preston, Lancashire on 4 March 1862, the son of William Crook, he was educated at St. James National School in Barrow-in-Furness, Alston College, and St. Johns College, Battersea. He became a BSc in 1886 and a BA in 1892 at London University. Crook held various appointments as a teacher and for 14 years was member of the executive of the National Union of Teachers, becoming president for a year in 1916.

In  the 1922 General Election he was elected a Member of Parliament for East Ham North for the Conservative and Unionist Party. He lost the seat the following year in the 1923 General Election to the labour candidate Susan Lawrence. Crook regained the seat in 1924 General Election and held it until his death.

Family life
In 1900 he married Grace Madeline Swinfen and they had a son and a daughter. Crook died aged 64 on 29 March 1926 at his home in Sidcup, Kent after a three-month illness.

References

External links
 

UK MPs 1922–1923
UK MPs 1924–1929
1862 births
1926 deaths
Conservative Party (UK) MPs for English constituencies
Politicians from Preston, Lancashire
Schoolteachers from Preston, Lancashire
Trade unionists from Preston, Lancashire
Alumni of the University of London
Presidents of the National Union of Teachers